New Addington was a ward covering the older part of the New Addington Estate in the London Borough of Croydon. It was abolished on 3 May 2018 and largely replaced by New Addington South.

References

Former wards of the London Borough of Croydon